Undir Mýruhjalla is a stadium in Skála, Faroe Islands. It is currently used mostly for football matches and is the home ground of Skála ÍF. The stadium holds 1,000 people and opened in 1968.

Undir Mýruhjalla hosted the Faroe Islands Cup final in 1984.

References

External links
 Skála Stadion - Nordic Stadiums

Football venues in the Faroe Islands
Skála ÍF
Sports venues completed in 1968
1968 establishments in the Faroe Islands